Jiři Malec (born 24 November 1962, in Vlastiboř) is a Czech former ski jumper who competed for Czechoslovakia from 1985 to 1990. Along with Jan Boklöv and Stefan Zünd, he was an early pioneer of the V-style. At the 1988 Winter Olympics in Calgary, he won a bronze in the individual normal hill.

External links 
  (under CZE nationality)
 

1962 births
Living people
People from Jablonec nad Nisou District
Czech male ski jumpers
Czechoslovak male ski jumpers
Ski jumpers at the 1988 Winter Olympics
Olympic bronze medalists for Czechoslovakia
Olympic medalists in ski jumping
Medalists at the 1988 Winter Olympics
Universiade medalists in ski jumping
Universiade gold medalists for Czechoslovakia
Universiade silver medalists for Czechoslovakia
Competitors at the 1985 Winter Universiade
Competitors at the 1987 Winter Universiade
Sportspeople from the Liberec Region